The wire-tailed manakin (Pipra filicauda) is a species of bird in the family Pipridae. It forms a superspecies with both the Band-tailed Manakin (Pipra fasciicauda) and the Crimson-hooded Manakin (Pipra aureola).
It is found upriver in the western Amazon Basin and the neighboring countries of northern Peru, eastern Ecuador and Colombia, and southern and western portions of Venezuela. In Venezuela it occurs upriver in the Orinoco River basin, but not the final 1300 km; its range in Venezuela continues around the Andes cordillera to the northwestern coast. In northwest Brazil, the species ranges from Roraima and Amazonas west to Venezuela and Colombia, and southwest from Rondônia and Acre to Peru and Ecuador.

Wire-tailed manakin's natural habitats are subtropical or tropical moist lowland forest and subtropical or tropical swampland.

References

External links
Wire-tailed manakin videos on the Internet Bird Collection
Stamps (for Ecuador) with RangeMap
Photo; Article sunbirdtours
Photo-Medium Res; Article mindobirds—"Amazonian Ecuador"
Photo-High Res; Article borderland-tours
Wire-tailed Manakin photo gallery VIREO Photo-High Res

wire-tailed manakin
Birds of the Amazon Basin
Birds of Colombia
Birds of Venezuela
Birds of the Ecuadorian Amazon
Birds of the Peruvian Amazon
wire-tailed manakin
Taxonomy articles created by Polbot